"One More Time" is the first track from Dream Theater lead vocalist James Labrie's second solo album Static Impulse. Along with the song "I Need You" it was released a month before the album to promote it. It was written by James LaBrie and Keyboard player Matt Guillory. All the vocals in the verses are performed by Swedish drummer Peter Wildoer. He performs screamed vocals throughout the album, Matt Guillory also performs additional screamed vocals throughout the album.

Personnel
James LaBrie - vocals
 Matt Guillory - keyboards, background vocals
 Marco Sfogli - guitars
 Peter Wildoer - drums, screaming vocals
 Ray Riendeau - bass guitar

2003 singles
Songs written by James LaBrie
2010 songs